Spotts is a surname. Notable people with the surname include:

Frederic Spotts (born 1930), American diplomat and historian
Jim Spotts (1909–1964), American baseball player
Ralph Spotts (1875–1924), American sport shooter

See also
Potts (surname)